Marda "Scrappy" Vanne (born Margaretha van Hulsteyn; 27 September 1896 – 27 April 1970) was a South African actress who found fame in London.

Early life
Margaretha was born in Pretoria, South African Republic to Sir Willem and Lady van Hulsteyn. Willem was born in The Netherlands in 1865 and emigrated to South Africa at the age of fifteen. He became a leading lawyer in Johannesburg and later a member of the South African Parliament for many years. During the South African War, he became an advisor to Lord Milner, the Governor of the Cape Colony, and was knighted by King Edward VII in 1902.

She was briefly married to politician Johannes Gerhardus "Hans" Strijdom, but the couple divorced within a year. Strijdom later went on to serve as Prime Minister of South Africa from 1954-58.

In 1914, Vanne met Isaac Rosenberg in Cape Town, who was on a visit to South Africa. He took a shine to her and drew a charcoal sketch of her. He also gave her a copy of his poem "If You Are Fire, and I Am Fire" and wrote a number of passionate love-poems at the time, which seem to have been inspired by her.

London
Vanne moved to London in 1918 to build on her acting career and studied speech training and drama under Elsie Fogerty at the Central School of Speech and Drama, then based at the Royal Albert Hall, London. After graduating she met director Basil Dean who recognised her talent and she had a successful career in the West End. She also performed on Broadway in Noël Coward's Easy Virtue (1925), directed by Dean,  and Many Waters (1929) by Monckton Hoffe.

Vanne became a good friend of Alec Waugh, the brother of Evelyn Waugh. Alec noted in one of his books that Marda tended to be cast in supporting roles. He suggested that it was because she "lacked sex appeal on stage. ... She lacked lightness. She did not look embraceable. I pictured her in more emotional roles, as a mature woman." He wrote that although she had several affairs with men, her main interest was women. John Gielgud became a good friend of Vanne and mentions her in his writings.

South African company
In London, Vanne formed a professional and personal partnership with the actress Gwen Ffrangcon-Davies that lasted until her death in 1970. The couple founded a theatre company in South Africa, at the outbreak of World War II, when most of the London theatres were dark. They toured the provinces, including appearances at the Hoffmeyer Theatre in Cape Town. There they performed their production of Twelfth Night in which Marda played Maria and Gwen played Olivia. They also produced and acted in the play Quality Street by James Barrie. They played 44 towns in fifteen weeks and made a small profit. Vanne  appeared as Madame Arcati in a production of Blithe Spirit in Johannesburg, and she and Ffrangcon-Davies brought their production of The Merry Wives of Windsor to the Alhambra Theatre in Cape Town in 1945.

In 1950, Vanne directed an Afrikaans translation of Grumpy, by Horace Hodges and T. Wigney Percyval called Oupa Brompie for the National Theatre Organisation (NTO) of South Africa.

They produced The Dam by South African writer Guy Butler in 1952, which the author criticised for portraying the Coloured (mixed-race) characters as caricatures.

Vanne gained British Citizenship in 1965. She died of cancer in 1970.

Selected work

Theatre
 If (1921) by Lord Dunsany – Mary Beal
 King Lear's Wife (1921) by Gordon Bottomley – Hygd
 Amphitryon; or, The Two Socia's (1922) by John Dryden – Phaedra
 Loyalties (1922) by John Galsworthy – Margaret Orme
 The Maid's Tragedy (1925) by Francis Beaumont and John Fletcher – Dula
 Rain (1925) by John Colton and Clemence Randolph (based on W. Somerset Maugham's story "Miss Thompson") – Mrs. Davidson
 Easy Virtue (1926) by Noël Coward – Marion
 Made in Heaven (1926) by Phyllis Morris – Jane Chute
 The Marriage of Figaro (1926) by Barry V. Jackson (after Beaumarchais) – Suzanne
 The Widowing of Mrs Holroyd (1926) – Mrs Holroyd
 The Constant Wife (1927) by W. Somerset Maugham
 The Desperate Lovers (1927) by Alfred Sutro – Lady Eulalie Havers
 The Happy Husband (1927) by Harrison Owen – Stella Tolhurst
 Home Chat (1927) by Noël Coward – Mavis Wittersham
 Many Waters (1928) by Monckton Hoffe – Mabel Wingrove, Mabel Barcaldine
 Two White Arms (1928) by Harold Dearden – Lydia Charrington
 Cape Forlorn (1930)
 For Services Rendered (1932) by W. Somerset Maugham  – Gwen Cedar
 Pleasure Cruise (1932) by Austen Allen – Judy Mills
 At 8 a.m. (1935) by Jan Fabricius
 Parnell (1936) by Elsie T. Schauffler – Mrs Benjamin Wood
 The King of Nowhere (1937) by James Bridie
 Lovers' Meeting (1937) by Leonard Ide
 The Provoked Wife (1937) – Lady Fanciful
 The Flashing Stream (1938) by Charles Morgan – Lady Helston
 Madmoiselle (1941) (in Afrikaans) with Siegfried Mynhardt
 Six Characters in Search of an Author (1954) by Luigi Pirandello
 Morning's at Seven (1956)
 Man and Superman (1965)

Filmography
 Strange Boarders (1938) – Mrs. Greatorex
 Joanna (1968)

Television
 The Great Adventure (1939)
 Passion, Poison and Petrifaction (1939)
 Prelude to Glory (1954)
 Vanity Fair (1956–57)
 BBC Sunday-Night Theatre  (1957)
 Peace and Quiet (1957)
 Our Mutual Friend (1958)
 Dark Possession  (1959)
 The Eustace Diamonds (1959)
 Knight Errant Limited (1960)
 Somerset Maugham Hour (1960)
 The First Gentleman (1961)
 Emergency-Ward 10 (1964)
 Theatre 625  (1965)
 Out of the Unknown (1965)
 Broome Stages (1966)
 Middlemarch  (1968)
 BBC Play of the Month  (1970)

Radio
 The Words Upon the Window Pane (1937) by William Butler Yeats

Personal life
A lesbian, Vanne was the partner, for many decades, of British actress Dame Gwen Ffrangcon-Davies.

Notes

References

External links

1896 births
1970 deaths
South African stage actresses
Naturalised citizens of the United Kingdom
South African lesbian actresses
20th-century LGBT people